Q-LAN is the audio over IP audio networking technology component of the Q-Sys platform from QSC Audio Products.

References

External links
Q-Sys Integrated system platform

Digital audio
Audio network protocols
Ethernet